Coastlines is a 2002 dramatic film written and directed by Victor Nuñez. It is the third of three films by Nuñez set in the Florida Panhandle after Ruby in Paradise (1993) and Ulee's Gold (1997). The film made its debut at the 2002 Sundance Film Festival but was not released until 2006 as it could not find a distributor.

Plot
Sonny Mann (Timothy Olyphant) is released early from prison and returns home to the Florida Panhandle and tries to collect $200,000 owed to him by his former cohorts, Fred Vance (William Forsythe) and his nephew Eddie (Josh Lucas). He enters into a love triangle with best friend Dave Lockhart (Josh Brolin), a sheriff, and his wife, Ann Lockhart (Sarah Wynter).

Cast

References

External links
 
 

2002 films
2002 drama films
Films directed by Victor Nuñez
Films set in Florida
American drama films
2000s English-language films
2000s American films